A Book of Discipline (or in its shortened form Discipline) is a book detailing the beliefs, standards, doctrines, canon law, and polity of a particular Christian denomination. They are often re-written by the governing body of the church concerned due to changes in society and in the denomination itself. As many Christian denominations are global, a Book of Discipline may be multilingual.

By Christian denomination

Methodism 
Methodist connexions have been using a Book of Discipline since 1784, which contains canon law and doctrine:

The Discipline of the Allegheny Wesleyan Methodist Connection
The Discipline of the Evangelical Wesleyan Church
Book of Discipline of the Free Methodist Church
 Book of Discipline for the United Methodist Church
Discipline of the Immanuel Missionary Church
The Discipline of the Wesleyan Methodist Connection

Presbyterianism 
 Book of Discipline of the Church of Scotland and Book of Common Order of the Church of Scotland

Quakerism 
Within Quaker Christianity, the text may be known as a Book of Discipline or a Manual of Faith and Practice:
 Book of Discipline of the Religious Society of Friends (Quakers) - each Yearly Meeting (national organisation of Quakers) publishes its own Book of Discipline, which may be titled the Book of Discipline or Faith and Practice or some other name.

References

External links 
Book of Discipline of the Wesleyan Methodist Church

Christian terminology
Methodism
Presbyterianism
Quakerism